Henrichemont, formerly known as Boisbelle, is a commune in the Cher department in the Centre-Val de Loire region of France. The village was created and named in honour of Henri IV in 1609 by Maximilien de Béthune, Duke of Sully to be the capital of the principality of Boisbelle and possibly a refuge for the protestants of the region. The principality approximated to the territories of the former canton of Henrichemont. The hamlet of La Borne is home to a restored tradition of stoneware pottery, attracting world-renowned artists and writers to stay there. The village is one of the most popular small tourist attractions in France.

History

Beginnings
From ancient times, Boisbelle had been a sovereign allod. Under Roman law, an allod is a freehold with none of the constraints of feudal tenure. Being sovereign meant that the owner had the rights of a ruler and governed the territory in complete independence: he or she could make laws, administer justice and mint money. 
The inhabitants of Boisbelle were free from any taxes or services and could not be conscripted into the armed forces, but were however subject to the requirements of the Roman Catholic Church.

Acquisition by Sully
On 31 August 1605, Maximilien de Béthune, Duke of Sully, a Protestant and a friend of King Henri IV since 1572, bought from the Duke of Nevers the title and lands of the principality of Boisbelle.

Challenges over status
As the French Treasury had challenged the tax-exempt position of Boisbelle, Sully obtained from Henri IV letters patent of 11 July 1606 and 27 October 1606 which confirmed its sovereign status and the immunity of its inhabitants. After further dispute with the provincial authorities over the gabelle salt tax, Henri IV issued further letters patent on 23 September 1608 declaring the people of Boisbelle free of all tax in perpetuity.

Foundation of the town of Henrichemont
Secure over the status of the principality, Sully decided to build a new capital, calling it Henrichemont in honour of the king. To lay out the town, he called on the civil engineer Claude Chastillon, while the design of the buildings was entrusted to the architect Salomon de Brosse. Planned as a grid, it was to have a Catholic church, a Protestant chapel, a secondary school, a market hall and an inn. The first stone was laid on 13 April 1609 on the central square, which was given the name of Béthune.

Assassination of Henri IV and collapse of project
On 14 May 1610, when Henri IV was assassinated, Sully lost his friend and protector. Rapidly, his offices were taken away and with them his income. Construction of his town slowed and the contractors fell into dispute with him. Work stopped in 1612 and lawsuits started, though in 1614 the archbishop of Bourges was able to consecrate the new church of St Laurent. In 1624, Sully was ordered by the court to pay the contractors and in 1636 the owners of the few private houses that had been built sold up at a loss.

Establishment of a mint
A mint to provide coinage for the principality was built and it operated from 1635 to 1656. The building still stands.

End of the principality
On 24 September 1766, the 7th Duke of Sully and last independent Prince ceded the principality to the Crown. It was integrated into France and the inhabitants lost all their privileges.

Geography

Population

Sights
 The church of St. Laurent, dating from the nineteenth century.
 Two museums of pottery at the hamlet of La Borne..
 A five-sided feudal motte.
 The “Maison de Sully”, an old house.

See also
Communes of the Cher department

References

External links

An historical website 
Ceramics centre of La Borne 
The pottery museum website at La Borne  
Official website of the Vassil Ivanoff museum 
Personal weblog about La Borne 

Communes of Cher (department)
Populated places established in 1609
1609 establishments in France
Berry, France